Khidirpur redirects to Kidderpore, a neighbourhood in Kolkata, West Bengal, India

It also refers to:
Kshidirpur, a census town in Nadia district, West Bengal, India
Khiddirpur railway station, a railway station in the Kolkata Suburban Railway system
Khidirpur, Murshdiabad, a census town in Murshidabad district, West Bengal, India